Gnomes and Trolls: The Secret Chamber is a 2008 Swedish animated children's fantasy film directed by Robert Rhodin for the Stockholm-based studio White Shark. The movie was the first CG animated movie produced by a Swedish company.

Plot 
Gnomes and Trolls, an action-adventure comedic fairy tale, marks White Shark's first foray into computer animation. Junior, a teenage gnome, wants nothing more than to invent gizmos and gadgets in his tree-house laboratory. But Junior's old school father, Jalle, the head gnome of the forest, would prefer his son follow in his footsteps and one day be in charge of his own forest. In spite of their differences, on the eve of the first winter storm Junior helps Jalle distribute food rations to the soon-to-be-hibernating animals. Then disaster strikes.

Perpetually bickering troll brothers Face and Slim execute their evil father Fassa's carefully plotted plan to steal the food from the gnome secret food chamber. After Jalle is accidentally injured, Junior and his best friend Sneaky, a paranoid neurotic crow, embark on a heroic journey to the depths of troll cave to retrieve the stolen food. Junior and Sneaky's adventure takes them across vast landscapes and into encounters with bizarre animals.

Along the way, Junior learns that it is possible to merge his passion for inventing with his newfound impetus to defend the forest. As Sneaky taps into an innate bravery he never knew he had, Slim battles an identity crisis, and Junior's mother Svea shatters the preconceived notions of what it means to be a gnome wife.

Cast 
Greg Berg as Sneaky
Joe Cappelletti as Face
Elizabeth Daily as Junior
Kate Higgins as Alley
Kym Lane as Fawn
Lloyd Sherr as Jalle
André Sogliuzzo as Fassa
James Arnold Taylor as Slim

Production 
The screenwriting was overseen by the exec producers Alec Sokolow and Joel Cohen. The total budget for the film was $5m (USD). The production was fast with a production time of 12 months from writing the script to delivering the 35mm print.

Film Festivals

2008
Halifax, Nova Scotia, Canada (Tue 21 April 2009)
Kristiansand, Norway (28 April 2009)
5th Dubai Film Festival 2008

2009
Zin Fest in Czech Republic
Buff filmfestival
Cairo International film festival
11th Seol International Youth Film Festival 2009 
 Jerusalem Cinematheque Children's film festival
 Nice film festival in Liverpool Nov/Dec 2009
10th China International Children's Film festival
4th International Bursa Silk Road Film Festival 2009

2010
6th Children's India Jan 2010
Bermuda Film Festival March 2010

References

External links 

2008 films
Films about trolls
Swedish animated fantasy films
2008 computer-animated films
Swedish-language films
2000s children's animated films
2000s children's fantasy films
Animated films based on Norse mythology
2000s English-language films
2000s Swedish films